Harmonia (Finnish) or Harmoni (Swedish, Harmony) is a fountain sculpture by Achim Kühn. It is located in the Aura River in Turku, Finland.

External links
Information on the sculpture, from the Wäinö Aaltonen Museum of Art

References

Statues and sculptures in Turku
1996 sculptures
Fountains in Finland
1996 establishments in Finland
Steel sculptures in Finland